AMG-36 (part of the AM cannabinoid series)  is an analgesic drug which is a cannabinoid agonist. It is a derivative of Δ8THC substituted with a cyclopentane group on the 3-position side chain. AMG-36 is a potent agonist at both CB1 and CB2 with moderate selectivity for CB1, with a Ki of 0.45 nM at CB1 vs 1.92 nM at CB2.

See also 
 AMG-3
 AMG-41

References 

Cannabinoids
Benzochromenes
Phenols
Cyclopentanes